The 1858 Rhode Island gubernatorial election was held on April 7, 1858.

Incumbent Republican Governor Elisha Dyer beat Democratic nominee Elisha R. Potter with 68.91% of the vote.

General election

Candidates
Elisha R. Potter, Democratic, former U.S. Representative, former State commissioner of public schools
Elisha Dyer, Republican, incumbent Governor

Declined
Alexander Duncan, Democratic

Results

References

1858
Rhode Island
Gubernatorial